Jafarabad-e Olya or Jafar Abad Olya may refer to:
Jafarabad-e Olya, Fars
Jafarabad-e Olya, Hamadan
Jafarabad-e Olya, Delfan, Lorestan Province
Jafarabad-e Olya, Kakavand, Lorestan Province
Jafarabad-e Olya, Quchan Atiq, Razavi Khorasan Province
Jafarabad-e Olya, Sudlaneh, Razavi Khorasan Province